The William & Mary Tribe women's basketball team represents the College of William & Mary in Williamsburg, Virginia in NCAA Division I competition. The school's team competes in the Colonial Athletic Association and play their home games in Kaplan Arena.

History
William & Mary began play in 1919, with Division I play beginning in 1984. They have made the postseason just once, with an appearance in the 2015 WBI. As of the end of the 2015–16 season, the Tribe have an all-time record of 619–928–9.

Postseason history

WBI results
The Tribe have appeared in one Women's Basketball Invitational (WBI). Their record is 0–1.

References

External links